is a passenger railway station in the city of Yachimata, Chiba Japan, operated by the East Japan Railway Company (JR East).

Lines

Layout
The station consists of two opposed side platforms connected by a footbridge.The station is staffed.

Platforms

History
Enokido Station was opened on April 1, 1957 as a passenger station on the Japan National Railways (JNR). The station was absorbed into the JR East network upon the privatization of the Japan National Railways  on April 1, 1987. The station building was renovated in 2008.

Passenger statistics
In fiscal 2019, the station was used by an average of 1998 passengers daily (boarding passengers only).

Surrounding area
 Yachimata High School
 Yachimata Kita Elementary School

See also
 List of railway stations in Japan

References

External links

  JR East station information 

Railway stations in Japan opened in 1958
Railway stations in Chiba Prefecture
Sōbu Main Line
Yachimata